Biotin PEG2 amine (biotine PEG2 amine) is a water-soluble pegylated biotin derivative used as linker in biotechnology and molecular biology applications.

Uses

Biotin PEG2 amine is used as a linker or cross linker. This allows to attach specific compounds to proteins or to antibodies.

A common use of biotin PEG2 amine is to use EDC and crosslink the amine in the biotin PEG2 amine to carboxyl groups on protein residues that are either aspartate or glutamate or the carboxy-terminus of proteins.

A particular example of use is labeling red cells, which in turn allows for the detection of these labeled cells in small samples using flow cytometry.

Related compounds

 Biotin-PEG2-maleimide
 Biotin-PEG3-amine
 Biotin-PEG4-NHS

References 

Amines
Carboxamides
Reagents for biochemistry